Camporeale (Sicilian: Campuriali) is a comune (municipality) in the Metropolitan City of Palermo in the Italian region Sicily, located about  southwest of Palermo.

Camporeale borders the following municipalities: Alcamo, Monreale.

Demographic evolution

References

External links
 www.comune.camporeale.pa.it/

Municipalities of the Metropolitan City of Palermo